Reginald Charles Humphries (1 August 1911 – 22 October 1986) was an Australian rules footballer who played with South Melbourne in the Victorian Football League (VFL).

Humphries, a defender, joined South Melbourne from Northcote. He was in the back pocket for South Melbourne in the 1935 VFL Grand Final, which they lost to Collingwood by 20 points.

He served with the Royal Australian Air Force in World War II.

References

External links

1911 births
1986 deaths
Australian rules footballers from Victoria (Australia)
Sydney Swans players
Northcote Football Club players
Royal Australian Air Force personnel of World War II